The college football playoff debate was a very hot topic of discussion, concerning college football in the United States, among fans, journalists, conference representatives, government officials, university administrators, coaches and players concerning whether or not the current postseason format of the Football Bowl Subdivision (formerly Division I-A) should be changed or modified. Playoff proponents had argued that a bracket-style playoff championship should replace the Bowl Championship Series, while others advocated for a Plus-one format, which would have created a single national championship game with participants selected after the conclusion of the traditional bowl season. This debate has been going since at least 1971.

The BCS system was established prior to the 1998 NCAA Division I-A football season to select two colleges to compete for college football's FBS division (formerly division I-A) national championship. There have been numerous controversies about the teams that should play for the college football national championship.

Several polls did show significant support among college football fans for a playoff to replace the BCS.

In 2012, the Commissioners of the BCS announced that a four-team College Football Playoff would replace the BCS following the 2013–14 college football season.

Ohio State beat Oregon 42-20 to win the first-ever College Football Playoff.

In 2022, the College Football Playoff announced that it would expand from a four-team playoff to a twelve-team playoff for the 2024 and 2025 seasons.

For a playoff
Playoff proponents argue against the internal validity of the BCS National Championship and lament that the participants of the BCS National Championship game are decided based upon coaches' and media polls rather than via previous, on-field competition such as the case with head-to-head, bracket-style tournaments in other major sports and levels of college football. Proponents occasionally accuse the Bowl Championship Series of financial conflict with respect to the money earned in bowl games and the allocation of those resources.

Barack Obama has spoken out in favor of a playoff, before and after the 2008 U.S. presidential election.  On November 18, 2008, in Obama's first interview as president-elect, Steve Kroft of 60 Minutes ended the interview with a question about the topic. Obama replied: I think any sensible person would say that if you've got a bunch of teams who play throughout the season, and many of them have one loss or two losses, there's no clear decisive winner that we should be creating a playoff system. Eight teams. That would be three rounds, to determine a national champion.  It would add three extra weeks to the season. You could trim back on the regular season. I don't know any serious fan of college football who has disagreed with me on this. So, I'm gonna throw my weight around a little bit. I think it's the right thing to do.

Proposals
Several proposals for change to the Bowl Championship Series (BCS) were presented. The BCS commissioners contemplated replacing the current BCS with a plus-one format, which would create a national championship game at the conclusion of the traditional bowl season with the two participants selected among BCS bowl winners. Ultimately, the commissioners rejected any immediate action and tabled the discussion on whether to establish a plus-one format.

Other proposed formats include a bracket-style playoff championship with 8, 10, 12, 16, 32, or 64 teams. Although popular among college football fans, these formats have gained little momentum within the circle of BCS commissioners. The official response from the BCS to these formats is: "if it ain't broke, don't fix it".

Another proposal to change the structure of the post-season came from the Mountain West Conference at the Bowl Championship Series commissioners' annual spring meetings in Pasadena, California in conjunction with the Rose Bowl's staging the 2010 BCS title game. The Mountain West Conference commissioner argued for a selection committee to replace the BCS ranking system, the establishment of an eight-team playoff, and a revision to the automatic qualifier rules.

The latest proposal was announced on June 26, 2012, and will adopt a four-team playoff system. The system is to go into effect starting after the 2013 season and continuing to 2025. A new selection committee will determine which four teams will be playing for the championship.

United States Senator Orrin Hatch (R-Utah) has indicated that he would hold congressional hearings on the BCS in the future after the 2008 Utah Utes football team didn't get to play in the national championship game after finishing the regular season undefeated (they were in the Mountain West at the time; they have since left for a Power 5 conference, the Pac-12 Conference).

Governmental intervention
According to CBSSports.com wire reports and information obtained by the Associated Press, Senator Orrin Hatch received a letter from the justice department concerning the possibility of a legal review of the BCS. The letter, received on January 29, 2010, states that the Obama administration will explore options to establish a college football playoff including (a) an antitrust lawsuit against the BCS, (b) legal action under Federal Trade Commission consumer protection laws, (c) encouragement of the NCAA to take control of the college football postseason, (d) the establishment of an agency to review the costs and benefits of adopting a playoff system, and (e) continued legislation in favor of a playoff system. Assistant Attorney General Ronald Weich writes, "The administration shares your belief that the lack of a college football national championship playoff ...raises important questions affecting millions...." BCS Executive Director Bill Hancock responded to the letter that the BCS complies with all laws and is supported by the participating Division I universities.

Following up on Senator Hatch's actions in the Senate, in April 2011 the Attorney General of Utah announced that he would be initiating a class action antitrust lawsuit against the BCS, despite the fact that Utah is moving to the Pacific-10 Conference, which is an automatic qualifying conference. In March 2011 the U.S. Justice Department sent a formal letter of notice to the NCAA asking for a detailed explanation about why FBS football was the only NCAA sport that the NCAA did not 1) have a playoff system in place to determine a champion and 2) why the NCAA had abrogated its responsibility to do so and given the authority to determine the NCAA Champion to an outside group such as the BCS. The Justice Department's investigation and Utah Attorney General's lawsuit are both aimed at forcing the BCS to open its books, which they are as a non-profit required to do every year and have never done, and at determining whether the BCS is an illegal trust or cartel based on Sherman Antitrust Act of 1890, the Clayton Antitrust Act of 1914 and the Robinson-Patman Anti-Price Discrimination Act of 1936. Two more states Attorneys General are said to be considering joining the Utah lawsuit, and the investigation by the Justice Department will probably include a minute and extensive examination of the Fiesta Bowl Scandal as well as conducting complete audits of the other BCS Bowls, the BCS itself and possibly even the schools of the 6 BCS Automatic Qualification Conferences.

The Fiesta Bowl scandal in particular was the catalyst that opened the BCS up to Federal interest for the first time, largely because the government is concerned not only about the BCS's stifling of fair competition, but more importantly for the Federal Government about the possibility of fraud and tax evasion, if the BCS has violated the rules governing tax exempt organizations and groups that control tax exempt organizations. If the BCS Bowls, who are each separate entities yet also part of the BCS as a whole as well were to lose their tax exempt status, they could be liable for back taxes totaling hundreds of millions of dollars. The Fiesta Bowl abuses – especially those regarding alleged illegal and improper political contributions,  excessive executive compensation and unjustified reimbursement payments, and the making of excessive, interest free and un-repaid loans – are precisely the types of abuses that would justify the Internal Revenue Service in stripping the BCS, and each BCS Bowl and possibly even each BCS Conference school (although that is highly unlikely) of their tax exempt status. In the worst-case scenario the BCS could also be subject to forfeiture and seizure proceedings. While the worst penalties are unlikely to be enforced, even the milder penalties, such as a determination of a cartel and trust, would have devastating consequences for the BCS and the current system. The court could also order a resolution of the current unfair competition inherent in the structure of the BCS, including ordering a playoff system and ordering the Bowls to participate as the court directs rather than as the bowls had planned in the case of the BCS's demise. Despite Big 10 Commissioner Delaney's assertion that if the BCS were to fold they would "go back to the old system" if a court ordered a solution such as a playoff the Conferences would have no choice in the matter, and would be required – especially if a determination is made that the BCS is an illegal trust or cartel – to do whatever the court says, including submitting to federal oversight of the Bowl's and Bowl teams' finances and administration, and conducting a 4, 8 or 16 team playoff, or whatever other remedy the court ordered in their holding. The structure, timing and participants in such a system would be completely out of the hands of the individuals and groups who now control those decisions, and those same individuals and groups would, in all likelihood, not be given the choice of not participating. A court ruling could require them to participate just as they are now, but they would be required to do so based on the court's rules rather than the BCS rules. This is one of the main reasons that the BCS is fighting against government intervention so strongly. The Department of Justice inquiry is far and away the most potentially dangerous legal situation that the BCS has faced to date.

See also 
College Football Playoff
BCS controversies
Bowl Championship Series
Mythical National Championship
NCAA Division I FBS National Football Championship

References

External links 
BCSfootball.org

Further reading

College football championships
Playoff debate